The following is a list of ambassadors of the United States to Turkmenistan as well as permanent chargés d'affaires posted from Washington for extended periods of time. This list excludes deputy chiefs of mission designated chargés d'affaires by the incumbent chief of mission during the chief of mission's temporary absence from Turkmenistan or during brief hiatuses between chiefs of mission. Note: The United States recognized Turkmenistan on December 25, 1991, and established diplomatic relations on February 19, 1992. Embassy Ashkhabad (now Ashgabat) was established March 17, 1992, with Jeffrey White as Chargé d'affaires ad interim.

Chiefs of mission

Notes

See also
Turkmenistan – United States relations
Foreign relations of Turkmenistan
Ambassadors of the United States

References
United States Department of State: Background notes on Turkmenistan

External links
 United States Department of State: Chiefs of Mission for Turkmenistan
 United States Department of State: Turkmenistan
 United States Embassy in Ashgabat

Turkmenistan

United States